Leichenlager is the third studio album by the German dark metal band Eisregen, released through Last Episode in 2000.

Track listing

Credits
 Michael "Blutkehle" Roth − vocals
 Michael "Bursche" Lenz − guitar
 Michael "Der Hölzer" Brill − bass
 Theresa "2T" Trenks - violin
 Ronny "Yantit" Fimmel − drums

References

2000 albums
Eisregen albums